Detonella is a genus of woodlice in the family Detonidae. There are at least two described species in Detonella.

Species
These two species belong to the genus Detonella:
 Detonella papillicornis (H. Richardson, 1904)
 Detonella sachalina Verhoeff, 1942

References

Isopoda
Articles created by Qbugbot